The Philippines women's national volleyball team represents the Philippines in international volleyball competitions and friendly matches, governed by Philippine National Volleyball Federation since 2021. Philippines' highest achievement was they qualified and competed in the FIVB Volleyball Women's World Championship in 1974 edition, where they finished at 18th place.

History
The Philippine national team was formerly organized and sanctioned by the Philippine Volleyball Federation (PVF), originally known as the  Philippine Amateur Athletic Federation (PAVA) from 1961 to 2003. The team was a regional powerhouse in Southeast Asia having won gold medals at the 1977, 1979, 1981, 1985, 1987 and 1993 editions of the Southeast Asian Games. The Philippines also participated at its first and only FIVB Volleyball World Championship in 1974.

The national team had its last gold medal at the Southeast Asian Games finish under Russian-Latvian head coach Staņislavs Lugailo, who was part of the Soviet Union men's national team that won gold at the 1964 Tokyo Olympics, was hired to lead the team in 1990. He guided the team to its bronze medal finish at the 1991 Southeast Asian Games. The national team had a training camp in Japan in 1992 where it played games against Japanese volleyball clubs. Lyugailo later led the national team to win a gold medal at the Southeast Asian Games in 1993 defeating defending champions Thailand in the final. Thailand would later defeat the Philippines in the next edition in 1995 in the gold medal match. The Philippines fail to duplicate its gold medal games for the next editions of the Southeast Asian Games with Thailand establishing dominance in women's volleyball in the region.

The Philippine national team did not see international play after the 2005 edition of the Southeast Asian Games and the Asian Championships. The Philippines won a bronze medal at the 2005 Southeast Asian Games. They would make a comeback at the Asian Championships in 2013 and at the Southeast Asian Games in 2015 respectively.

In 2014, the PVF lost recognition of the Philippine Olympic Committee after a leadership crisis. The Fédération Internationale de Volleyball (FIVB) recognized the Larong Volleyball sa Pilipinas, Inc. (LVPI) as  its provisional member in 2015 effectively taking over the PVF's mandate. The LVPI was allowed to send and organize national volleyball teams, including the women's team to FIVB tournaments for the next few years.

After failing to get a podium finish at the 2015 Southeast Asian Games, it was decided that the national team coached by Roger Gorayeb will be disbanded. However it is later decided that Gorayeb will remain coach of the national team which participated in another tournament, the 2015 VTV International Women's Volleyball Cup. The team finish last out of six teams and was without many of its players that played in the Southeast Asian Games.

In 2021, the Philippine National Volleyball Federation (PNVF) was formed and was given full FIVB membership replacing the LVPI as the volleyball federation for volleyball in the Philippines.

Fixtures and results

Competitive record

FIVB Volleyball World Championship

Asian Women's Championship

Asian Women's Volleyball Cup

{| class="wikitable collapsible collapsed" style="text-align:center; font-size:90%; width:70%;"
! colspan="11" style="background: #000080; color: #FFFFFF|Asian Women's Volleyball Cup History
|-
!rowspan=2|Opponent
!rowspan=2|Date
!rowspan=2|Result
!colspan=6|Set
!rowspan=2|Event
!rowspan=2|Location
|-
!width=5%|1
!width=5%|2
!width=5%|3
!width=5%|4
!width=5%|5
!width=5%|Total
|-style="text-align:center;"
|style="text-align:left;"|
|
|style="background:#ffdddd;|2–3
|25–21
|25–21
|24–26
|16–25
|10–15
|100–108
|rowspan=5|2018 Asian Women's Volleyball Cup
|rowspan=5|	Nakhon Ratchasima, Thailand
|-style="text-align:center;"
|style="text-align:left;"|
|
|style="background:#ffdddd;|2–3
|29–27
|16–25
|25–17
|12–25
|13–15
|95–109
|-style="text-align:center;"
|style="text-align:left;"|
|
|style="background:#ddffdd;|3–1
|25–22
|25–23
|20–25
|25–17
| –
|95–87
|-style="text-align:center;"
|style="text-align:left;"|
|
|style="background:#ffdddd;|1–3
|13–25
|26–24
|7–25
|21–25
| –
|67–99
|-style="text-align:center;"
|style="text-align:left;"|
|
|style="background:#ddffdd;|2–3
|13–25
|25–23
|22–25|25–17
|8–15|93–105|-style="text-align:center;"
|style="text-align:left;"|
|
|style="background:#ffdddd;|0–3
|19–25
|17–25
|29–31
| –
| –
|65–81
|rowspan=7|2022 Asian Women's Volleyball Cup
|rowspan=7|Pasig City, Philippines 
|-style="text-align:center;"
|-style="text-align:center;"
|style="text-align:left;"|
|
|style="background:#ffdddd;|0–3
|16–25
|22–25
|20–25
| –
| –
|58–75
|-style="text-align:center;"
|style="text-align:left;"|
|
|style="background:#ddffdd;|3–1|25–19|25–22|20–25
|25–14| –
|95–80|-style="text-align:center;"
|style="text-align:left;"|
|
|style="background:#ddffdd;|3–0|25–18|25–13|25–17| –
| –
|75–48|-style="text-align:center;"
|style="text-align:left;"|
|
|style="background:#ffdddd;|1–3
|18–25
|25–23|20–25
|9–25
| –
|72–98
|-style="text-align:center;"
|style="text-align:left;"|
|
|style="background:#ddffdd;|3–2|21–25
|25–19|19–25
|25–18|15–12|105–99|-style="text-align:center;"
|style="text-align:left;"|
|
|style="background:#ffdddd;|1–3
|26–28
|21–25
|21–25
|
|
|68–78
|}

Asian Games

Asian Games: Nine-a-side

Southeast Asian Games

ASEAN Grand Prix

Other Tournaments

Team

Current squad

The following persons were assigned by the Philippine National Volleyball Federation as part of the coaching staff.

Starting Rotation

Former squads

2014 FIVB Women's World Championship qualification (AVC-Southeastern Zonal)

 Khe Sanh 2006
(1) Rubie De Leon C, (2) Alyja Daphne Santiago, (3) Suzanne Roces, (4) Iari Yongco, (5) Maria Paulina Soriano, (7) Maika Angela Ortiz, (10) Rhea Katrina Dimaculangan, (11) Myla Pablo, (12) Jennylyn Reyes L, (14) Angelique Beatrice Dionela L, (16) Aleona Denise Santiago
Head coach: Roger Gorayeb

2006 FIVB Women's World Championship AVC Qualification

 Thailand 2006
(1) Rubie De Leon, (3) Ruby May Rovira, (4) Marietta Carolino, (6) Johanna Carpio, (7) Cristina Salak, C (8) Roxanne Pimentel, (9) Michelle Carolino, (10) Maureen Penetrante, (11) Cherry Rose Macatangay, (12) Patricia Siatan, (14) Monica Aleta, L (16) Shermain Miles Penano.
Head coach: Ramil De Jesus

2018 Asian GamesCoaching staff Head coach: Cesael delos Santos
 Assistant coach(s): Emilio Reyes Jr. Brian EsquibelTeam staff Team Manager:
 Team Utility:Medical staff Team Physician:
 Physical Therapist/Trainer:

2017 Asian Women's Volleyball ChampionshipCoaching staff Head coach:Francis Vicente
 Assistant coach(s):Brian EsquibelZenaida ChavezTeam staff Team Manager:Danilo E. Ignacio
 Team Utility:Medical staff Team Physician:Raul Alcantara
 Physical Therapist/Trainer:Ronald DulayEmilio Reyes

2015 Asian Women's ChampionshipCoaching staff Head coach: Sinfronio "Sammy" Acaylar (CIG)
 Assistant coach(s): Francis Vicente (PHG) Rosemarie Prochina (MNT) Benson Bocboc (SHP)Team Staff Team Manager:
 Team Utility: Medical Staff Team Physician:
 Physical Therapist: Marie Ong

2013 Asian Women's Championship

 Thailand 2013 — 12th placeAiza Maizo-Pontillas , Maria Angeli Tabaquero (C), Angelique Dionela, Jennifer May Macatuno, Wenneth Eulalio, Maria Paulina Soriano, Analyn Joy Benito, Lizlee Ann Gata-Pantone, Honey Royse Tubino, Danika Yolanda Gendrauli, Relea Ferina Saet, Michelle Pauline Datuin
Head coach: Ernesto Pamilar
Assistant coach: Norman Miguel

2022 Asian Women's Volleyball Cup

The following persons were assigned by the Philippine National Volleyball Federation as part of the coaching staff.

2018 Asian Women's Volleyball CupCoaching staff Head coach: Cesael delos Santos
 Assistant coach(s): Erickson RamosTeam staff Team Manager:
 Team Utility:Medical staff Team Physician:
 Physical Therapist/Trainer:

2021 Southeast Asian Games

The following persons were assigned by the Philippine National Volleyball Federation as part of the coaching staff.

2019 Southeast Asian GamesCoaching staff Head coach: Cesael delos Santos
 Assistant coach(s): Erickson RamosTeam staff Team Manager:
 Team Utility:Medical staff Team Physician:
 Physical Therapist/Trainer:

2017 Southeast Asian GamesCoaching staff Head coach:Francis Vicente
 Assistant coach(s):Brian EsquibelZenaida ChavezTeam staff Team Manager:Danilo E. Ignacio
 Team Utility:Medical staff Team Physician:Raul Alcantara
 Physical Therapist/Trainer:Ronald DulayEmilio Reyes

(source)

2015 Southeast Asian GamesCoaching staff Head coach:  Roger Gorayeb
 Assistant coach(s): Anusorn Bundit Aiza Maizo-PontillasTeam staff Team Manager:
 Team Utility: Medical staff Team Physician:
 Physical Therapist:

2005 Southeast Asian Games

 Manila 2005 —  Bronze medalCristina Salak, Mary Jean Balse, Rubie De Leon, Maureen Penetrante, Cherry Rose Macatangay, Michelle Carolino, Mayeth Carolino, Joanna Botor, Amy Guanco, Roxanne Pimentel, Monica Aleta, 
Head coach: Ramil De Jesus

1983 Southeast Asian Games

 Singapore 1983 —  Silver medalLita Dela Cruz, Grace R. Antigua, Julie Dela Cruz, Thelma Barina, Josefina Paulita, Josefin Maranga, Ma. Lourdes Jao, Violeta Rastullo, Noraida Lorosa, Arlene Apostal, Ofelia Tamonan, Lynette Amancio

2019 ASEAN Grand Prix

First LegCoaching staff Head coach: Cesael delos Santos
 Assistant coach(s): Erickson RamosTeam staff Team Manager:
 Team Utility:Medical staff Team Physician:
 Physical Therapist/Trainer:

Second LegCoaching staff Head coach: Cesael delos Santos
 Assistant coach(s): Erickson Ramos  Emilio Reyes Jr   Brian EsquildelTeam staff Team Manager:
 Team Utility:Medical staff Team Physician:
 Physical Therapist/Trainer:
 Clarence Estban

2015 VTV CupCoaching staff Head coach:  Roger Gorayeb
 Assistant coach(s): Nes Pamilar Parley Tupas

Youth teams

Previous squadsCoaching staff 
 Head coach: Emilio Reyes Jr.
 Assistant coach(s): Cristina SalakTeam staff Team Manager:
Marissa Andres
 Team Utility:Medical staff Team Physician:
 Physical Therapist/Trainer:
 Clarence EstebanCoaching staff Head coach:  Roger Gorayeb
 Assistant coach(s):  Anusorn Bundit Edjet Mabbayad Parley TupazTeam Staff Team Manager:Ramon Cojuangco Jr.
 Team Utility: Medical Staff Team Physician:
 Physical Therapist: Raymond Pili

In 2016, the Under-19 team finished 10th among 15 teams in the 2016 Asian Women's U19 Volleyball Championship. It defeated Australia while losing to Chinese Taipei and South Korea in straight sets in the Group D stage. In the 9th–12th place playoffs, it won against Macau in straight sets but it lost to Iran in 5 thrilling sets.Roster Isabelle Camama, Jeanette Villareal, Mary Anne Mendrez, Kathleen Faith Arado, Seth Rodriguez, Dianne Latayan, Rica Diolan, Jasmine Nabor, Mariella Gabarda, Ria Beatriz Duremdez, Trishia Mae Genesis and Zilfa Olarve
 Head coach:  Francis Vicente

The following persons were assigned by the Philippine National Volleyball Federation as part of the coaching staff.

In 2014, the Under-17 team finished 7th among 13 teams in the 2014 Asian Youth Girls Volleyball Championship. It defeated Australia and India while losing to China in straight sets in the Group C stage. In the Qualifying Round, it lost to Thailand while winning against New Zealand in 4 sets. In the Quarterfinals, it lost to South Korea. In the 5th–8th place playoffs, it lost to Kazakhstan in 5 sets. In the 7th place game, it won against New Zealand again.Roster''':
 Ezra Gyra Barroga, Rica Diolan, Justine Dorog, Christine Dianne Francisco, Ejiya Laure, Maristela Genn Layug, Kristine Magallanes, Nicole Anne Magsarile, Maria Lina Isabel Molde, Jasmine Nabor, Faith Janine Shirley Nisperos, Roselyn Rosier, Alyssa Marie Teope and Caitlin Viray
 Head coach:  Jerry Yee 
 Team Manager:  Mariano See T. Diet

Results

Asian Youth Volleyball Championship

Asian Girls' U20 Volleyball Championship

Asian Women's U23 Volleyball Championship

Coaches
The following were head coaches of the senior national team:

See also
 Philippines women's national under-23 volleyball team
 Philippines women's national under-18 volleyball team
 Philippines men's national volleyball team
 Philippines women's national beach volleyball team
 Philippines national volleyball teams in FIVB club tournaments
 Premier Volleyball League
 Philippine Super Liga
 Volleyball in the Philippines

References

Volleyball in the Philippines
Women's national sports teams of the Philippines
National women's volleyball teams
Women's volleyball teams in the Philippines